Shingak-Kul (Şöñgäkkül) is a rural locality (a selo) and the administrative centre of Shingak-Kulsky Selsoviet, Chishminsky District, Bashkortostan, Russia. The population was 2,975 as of 2010. There are 33 streets.

Geography 
Shingak-Kul is located 27 km southwest of Chishmy (the district's administrative centre) by road. Yabalakly is the nearest rural locality.

References 

Rural localities in Chishminsky District